Meixian may refer to the following places in China:

 Meixian District, a district in Meizhou, Guangdong
 Meixian dialect, the local dialect of Hakka spoken there
 Mei County, also known as Meixian, a county in Shaanxi
 Meixian, Fujian, town in and subdivision of Youxi County, Fujian
 Meixian, Hunan, town in and subdivision of Pingjiang County, Hunan